Crayfish are eaten all over the world. Like other edible crustaceans, only a small portion of the body of a crayfish is edible. In most prepared dishes, such as soups, bisques and étouffées, only the tail portion is served. At crawfish boils or other meals where the entire body of the crayfish is presented, other portions, such as the claw meat, may be eaten.

Claws of larger boiled specimens are often pulled apart to access the meat inside. Another favorite is to suck the head of the crayfish, as seasoning and flavor can collect in the fat of the boiled interior.

Regional cuisines

Australia

Australia is home to genus Cherax which is distinct from European, Asian and North and South American species. Two of the Australian edible crayfish are the common yabby (C. destructor) and the red claw (C. quadricarinatus). The common yabby is closest in size to the North American species, but is not considered to be commercially viable outside Australia because of its relatively slow growth and small size. The "red claw" crayfish are twice the size of North American crayfish and they contain 30% edible "meat" compared to 15% for P. clarkii. Other Australian species are fairly rare and thus usually are not used for food. Their slow growth generally makes them inefficient for aquaculture.

China
The culinary popularity of crayfish swept across mainland China in the late 1990s. Crayfish is generally served with Mala flavor (a combined flavor of Sichuan pepper and hot chili) or otherwise plainly steamed whole, to be eaten with a preferred sauce. In Beijing, the ma la flavored crayfish is shortened to "ma xiao" and is often enjoyed with beer in a hot mid-summer evening.

France

Crayfish tails and butter are also used to flavor the Nantua sauce commonly served with quenelles. Crayfish and fried eggs are the historically common garnish for chicken Marengo, although they are often omitted today.

Madagascar
An invasive species, the Marbled crayfish are eaten in Madagascar. This species is parthenogenic where the eggs hatch without fertilisation, meaning that they are all clones of each other. Human interest in consuming them may be helping them to spread 100-fold from 2007 to 2017.

Mexico
The Mexican crayfish locally named acocil was a very important nutrition source of the ancient Mexican Aztec culture. Other regional names for crayfish are chacales, chacalines and langostinos. Today, crayfish is consumed mainly boiled, similarly to crayfish dishes in other parts of the world, or prepared with typically Mexican sauces and condiments, particularly in central and southern Mexico. Traditional preparations include soups, tacos and "cocktails" similar to shrimp dishes.

Nigeria
Crayfish are usually smoked, and occasionally sun-dried, and they form an indispensable food item in the diet of the people of the entire southern states in particular and Nigeria as a whole. It is a core of Nigerian cooking.

Nordic countries

Crayfish is a popular dish in Sweden and Finland, and is by tradition primarily consumed at a crayfish party, called kräftskiva, during the fishing season in August. The boil is typically flavored with salt, sugar, ale, and large quantities of stems and flowers of the dill plant. While most Americans eat them warm, the Swedes and Finns normally eat them cold after letting them sit in a brine over night. One traditional Swedish and Finnish practice is to eat crayfish with a vodka or akvavit chaser. Most crayfish in Sweden are fished by professional fishermen or by lakeside property owners. The only lake where crayfish fishing is not limited to professionals and landowners is in Lake Vättern. The catch of domestic freshwater crayfish, Astacus astacus, and even of a transplanted American species, Pacifastacus leniusculus, is very limited, and to satisfy demand, the majority of what is consumed has to be imported. Sales depended on imports from Spain and Turkey for several decades, but after a decline in supply, China and the United States are today the biggest sources of import.

Russia and Ukraine
In Russia and Ukraine, crayfish (sing. ) are a traditional seasonal appetizer that is used as an accompaniment to beer and liquor. Although native varieties tend to be larger (usually, Astacus astacus), rampant freshwater pollution and years of overfishing largely limit availability to imports—most from Armenia, Kazakhstan and China. Prior to cooking, the crustaceans are soaked in water or milk, then boiled live for 7–15 minutes in rapidly boiling salted water with additional ingredients, such as carrots, onion, dill, parsley, bay leaf, peppercorns. More extravagant preparations include such ingredients as white wine, beer, sour cream, cloves, caraway seed, coriander seed, chili peppers, stinging nettle, etc. Russians rarely incorporate crayfish into complex dishes and, unlike other cultures, they usually consume the entire crayfish, short of the shell and the antennae. Russian and Ukrainian fascination with crayfish goes back quite far and generates considerable lore. An old proverb: "When there is no fish, even crayfish is a fish." There are as many myth associated with picking the freshest live crayfish as there are for picking ripe watermelons. Russians and Ukrainians, generally, will not cook fresh crayfish if the crustaceans are dead or perceptibly lethargic. (But pre-boiled frozen specimens are acceptable.)

Spain

In Spain, crayfish is called  (lit. "river crab"). They used to be widely consumed, especially in Castile and León and Aragon, but over-fishing and the introduction of non-native crayfish species (e.g. Procambarus clarkii, commonly called ) led to a dramatic decline in crayfish population. Nowadays they remain as a seasonal delicacy, usually stewed in tomato sauce, although fishing the native crayfish is strictly forbidden since the species is nearly extinct. Instead of the native crayfish, it is common to fish Procambarus clarkii or Pacifastacus leniusculus, also present in most of the Spanish rivers.

United States
In the United States, crayfish are often referred to as crawfish, crawdads, fiddlers, crawdaddies, or mudbugs. As of 2018, 93% of crawfish farms in the US were located in Louisiana. In 1987, Louisiana produced 90% of the crayfish harvested in the world, 70% of which were consumed locally. In 2007, the Louisiana crayfish harvest was about 54,800 tons, almost all of it from aquaculture. About 70%–80% of crayfish produced in Louisiana are Procambarus clarkii (red swamp crawfish), with the remaining 20%–30% being Procambarus zonangulus (white river crawfish). Despite the large-scale production in Louisiana, most frozen crayfish available in supermarkets in other states are Chinese imports. As early as 2003, Asian farms and fisheries produced more red swamp crayfish (P. clarkii) than the Americas, and this trend accelerated in subsequent years. By 2018, P. clarkii crawfish production in the Americas represented just 4% of total global P. clarkii supply, with Asian production accounting for the rest. 

In Louisiana, Mississippi, and Southeast Texas, crayfish are generally served at a gathering known as a crawfish boil. The crayfish are usually boiled live in a large pot with heavy seasoning (salt, cayenne pepper, lemon, garlic, bay leaves, etc.) and other items such as potatoes, corn on the cob, onions, garlic, mushrooms, turkey necks, and sausage. There are many differing methods used to season a crawfish boil, and a wide variety of opinions on which one is best. Other popular dishes in the Cajun and Creole cuisines of Louisiana include crawfish étouffée, fried crawfish, crawfish pie, crawfish dressing, crawfish bread, crawfish bisque and crawfish beignets.

In Houston, Texas, a regional style of Vietnamese-Cajun crawfish has developed.

The Cherokee people have a long tradition of catching crawdads by gigging. The crawdads are cleaned, then soaked, "in hot water with about one tablespoon of salt." The crawdads are lightly breaded with cornmeal before frying, and seasoned with salt and pepper.

Religions

Judaism
Like all crustaceans, crawfish are not kosher because they are aquatic animals that have neither fins nor scales. They are therefore not eaten by observant Jews.

Boiling alive
Boiling a crayfish alive is considered by many to be inhumane, and protests against this have been increasing. In 2018, Switzerland was the first country to ban the live boiling of lobsters.
Norway, Austria, New Zealand and some Australian territories also place restrictions on the inhumane treatment of lobsters. Cities in Germany and Italy also have explicitly banned the practice of boiling lobsters alive.

In 2021, a study conducted by experts from the London School of Economics concluded there was "strong scientific evidence decapod crustaceans and cephalopod molluscs are sentient". This will probably result in a ban on the boiling of live lobsters in UK under proposed legislation.

After the publication of the report, The Netherlands banned the boiling alive of crabs and lobsters.

References

External links

 Crayfish recipes. BBC Food.

Crayfish
 
Commercial crustaceans
Swedish cuisine
Louisiana cuisine
Crayfish dishes